Giovanni Andrea Cornia (born 9 April 1947), is a development economist. He is professor of economics, department of economics and management (formerly faculty of economics), at the University of Florence. He has previously been the director of the Regional Institute of Economic Planning of Tuscany (Istituto Regionale Programmazione Economica della Toscana, IRPET), the United Nations University World Institute for Development Economics Research (UNU-WIDER), in Helsinki, and the Economic and Policy Research Program, UNICEF Office of Research-Innocenti, in Florence. He was formerly also chief economist, UNICEF, New York. His main areas of professional interest are income and asset inequality, poverty, growth, child well-being, human development and mortality crises, transition economics, and institutional economics. He is author of over a dozen books and dozens of articles, reports and working papers on practical development economics issues in individual countries, regions and globally.

Selected bibliography

Books

References

External links 
 Personal profile: Giovanni Andrea Cornia Università degli Studi di Firenze
 Personal profile: Giovanni Andrea Cornia United Nations University – UNU-WIDER

1947 births
Development economists
Italian economists
Living people
Macroeconomists